Francesco Selmi (7 April 1817 – 13 August 1881) was an Italian chemist and patriot, one of the founders of colloid chemistry.

Selmi was born in Vignola, then part of the Duchy of Modena and Reggio. He became head of a chemistry laboratory in Modena in 1840, and a professor of chemical pharmacology and toxicology at the University of Bologna in 1867. He published the first systematic study of inorganic colloids, in particular silver chloride, Prussian blue, and sulfur, in the period 1845–50.

He died in Vignola on 13 August 1881.

References

External links
 Fondo Documentario Francesco Selmi, Biblioteca Comunale di Vignola
 Francesco Selmi, books and articles, Google Book Search
 Celebri Vignolesi

1817 births
1881 deaths
Italian chemists
People from Vignola
Colloid chemists